The Republic of Nauru has one museum:

 Nauru Museum, located in Yaren.

Museums
Nauru
Nauru
Museums